Hypermastus orstomi is a species of sea snail, a marine gastropod mollusk in the family Eulimidae.

Description
The length of the shell attains 6 mm.

Distribution
This marine species occurs off New Caledonia.

References

External links
 Warén A., Norris D.R. & Templado J. (1994). Descriptions of four new eulilmid gastropods parasitic on irregular sea urchins. The Veliger. 37(2):141-154
 To World Register of Marine Species

Eulimidae
Gastropods described in 1994